Triaria (1st-century) was a Roman woman, the second wife of Lucius Vitellius the Younger (the brother of emperor Aulus Vitellius).

She is mentioned on the funeral monument of her favourite slavewoman, Tyrannis, in Tibur:

According to Tacitus, when former praetor Marcus Plancius Varus implied treasonable behaviour by Dolabella, she terrified the City Prefect, Titus Flavius Sabinus, warning him not to seek a reputation for clemency by endangering the Emperor.

She was accused of wearing a soldier's sword and behaving with insolent cruelty after the capture of the town of Tarracina.

In On Famous Women, Boccaccio praised Triaria for her bravery.   An early French manuscript of this work contains a plate f. 63v (captioned "Miniature showing a bloody slaughter inside a walled city, with Triaria prominent among the wounded warriors.") which may refer to the sack of Tarracina.

See also
 Triaria gens

Notes

External links
 De memorailibus et claris mulieribus: aliquot diversorum scriptorum opera, Ravisius, Johannes (Ed.)
 Boccaccio on Triaria (in Spanish)

Primary sources

 Gaius Cornelius Tacitus Historiae ii.63, iii.76-77
 Continuité gentilice et continuité sénatoriale dans les familles sénatoriales romaines à l'époque impériale'', 2000

1st-century Roman women
Ancient Roman women in warfare
Women in 1st-century warfare